Varnam is a 2011 Indian Tamil-language drama film directed by Raju S. M., starring Giridharan, Aathish, Monica, Sampath, Aswatha and Vijay Sethupathi, Muthukumar and Karate Raja. Raju S. M., who produced the Malayalam film Anandabhadram, turns director with this film.

Cast
 Giridharan as Mani
 Aathish as Anwara (Velu)
 Monica as Kavitha
 Aswatha as Thangam
 Sampath as Durai
 Vijay Sethupathi as Nanda
 Muthukumar as Rathnam
 Karate Raja as Muniyandi

Festivals
Varnam has been the official selection in the following film festivals:
 Montreal World Film Festival in 2011
 London Asian Film Festival 2011
 Chennai International Film Festival 2011
 Norway Tamil Film Festival Awards 2012
 New York Indian Film Festival 2012
 Roxbury Film Festival 2012

Reception 
A critic from The Hindu wrote that "Merits apart, Varnam boasts of a strong storyline. It is the screenplay that lacks punch". Dinamalar praised the cinematography and the music. A critic from The New Indian Express wrote that "Meticulously crafted, deftly narrated and intriguing, 'Varnam' is a definite watch". A critic from Deccan Chronicle gave the film a rating of three out of five stars and wrote that "Varnam is worth a watch". A critic from Sify gave the film a rating of two out of five stars and wrote that "The film may prove a tad slow to those who are used to fast paced action films or too realistic for those in love with glossy romantic love stories". A critic from Behindwoods wrote that "Obviously, entertainment is not the objective of the film; it tries to convey a message and it must get across to those who are open to such efforts".

References

External links

2011 films
2010s Tamil-language films